There have been three baronetcies created for members of the Dixwell family, all of whom are descended from Charles Dixwell (died 1591) of Coton House, near Churchover, Warwickshire. All three baronetcies are extinct.

The Dixwell Baronetcy, of Tirlington in the County of Kent, was created in the Baronetage of England for Basil Dixwell, the youngest son of Charles, on 27 February 1628. He had inherited the estate of a maternal uncle near Folkestone, Kent and was member of parliament for Hythe in 1626 and High Sheriff of Kent in 1627. In 1622 he built a new mansion at Broome Park near Canterbury which became his principal residence. He died without issue in 1642 when the baronetcy became extinct.

The Dixwell Baronetcy, of Broome House in the County of Kent, was created on 19 June 1660, for Basil Dixwell great nephew and heir of Sir Basil Dixwell of Tirlington, from whom he inherited the Broome House estate. His son the second Baronet was Governor of Dover Castle, and Member of Parliament for Dover 1689–90 and 1699–1700. He died without issue in 1750 when and the baronetcy became extinct. He left his estate to his youngest nephew, Sir George Oxenden, 5th Baronet, through his sister Elizabeth Oxenden (see Oxenden baronets)., as a condition of which his nephew was required to take on the surname of Dixwell.

The Dixwell Baronetcy, of Coton House, was created on 11 June 1716 for William Dixwell, (great-great-grandson of Charles Dixwell), who was High Sheriff of Warwickshire in that year. It became extinct on his death in 1757.

Dixwell baronets, of Tirlingham (1628)
 Sir Basil Dixwell, 1st Baronet (1585–1642)

Dixwell baronets, of Broome House (1660)
 Sir Basil Dixwell, 1st Baronet (1640–1668)
 Sir Basil Dixwell, 2nd Baronet (1665–1750)

Dixwell baronets, of Coton House (1716)
 Sir William Dixwell, 1st Baronet (1688–1757)

References

 Burke's Genealogical and Heraldic History of the Extinct and Dormant Baronetcies of England Ireland and Scotland 2nd Edition (1844) pp161–2 Google Books
 

Extinct baronetcies in the Baronetage of England
Extinct baronetcies in the Baronetage of Great Britain